Kacgae is a village in Ghanzi District of Botswana. It is located in the southern part of the district, and it has a primary school. The population was 282 in 2001 census.

References

Ghanzi District
Villages in Botswana